Aphanomyces cladogamus is an oomycete plant pathogen.

References

Water mould plant pathogens and diseases
Saprolegniales
Species described in 1929